Juana de la Cruz is the name of:

Juana Inés de la Cruz, Mexican scholar
Juana de la Cruz Vázquez Gutiérrez, Spanish abbess
Juana dela Cruz, Philippine personification